Richard J. Cull Jr. (September 12, 1914 – April 24, 1992) was a reporter in Washington D.C. for the Dayton Daily News and the Cox Newspapers syndicate from 1947 to 1962.

Cull then served as a press information officer for the U.S. Immigration and Naturalization Service from 1962 to 1975. When the survivors of the Bay of Pigs invasion were released from Cuban custody in 1962, Cull  handled the press coverage of their return to the United States.

References

External links
Oral History With Richard Cull Jr., Harry S. Truman Presidential Library
Papers of Richard Cull, Dwight D. Eisenhower Presidential Library
Richard Cull Jr.'s obituary

American male journalists
1914 births
1992 deaths
20th-century American writers
20th-century American journalists
20th-century American male writers